Lachlan Whitfield (born 18 July 1994) is a professional Australian rules footballer playing for the Greater Western Sydney Giants in the Australian Football League (AFL). He was the first overall selection in the 2012 AFL draft.

Early years
He played in the TAC Cup for the Dandenong Stingrays. He won the Larke Medal as the best player at the 2012 AFL Under 18 Championships.

Growing up, he supported the Hawthorn Football Club.

AFL career
In November 2016, Whitfield was suspended for six months for "bringing the game into disrepute" as a result of taking illicit drugs in May 2015 and attempting to evade drug testing at the time under the guidance of Greater Western Sydney administrators Graeme Allan and Craig Lambert.

At the end of the 2017 season, Whitfield signed a contract extension with the Giants, keeping him at the club until the end of 2020. During the 2018 season Lachie made his way from the midfield into the backline as a running Halfback due to several injuries to teammates and in August 2018, Whitfield was named in the 2018 All-Australian team on Halfback after having a career best year in his new position. Whitfield who was soon to become a free agent in 2020, had ignored rumours and speculation and had signed a 7 year deal, tying him to Greater Western Sydney until 2027.

Statistics
 Statistics are correct to the end the Preliminary Final, 2019

|- style="background:#eaeaea;"
! scope="row" style="text-align:center" | 2013
|style="text-align:center;" style="white-space: nowrap;|
| 6 || 19 || 8 || 4 || 174 || 158 || 332 || 103 || 42 || 0.4 || 0.2 || 9.2 || 8.3 || 17.5 || 5.4 || 2.2|| 1
|-
! scope="row" style="text-align:center" | 2014
|style="text-align:center;"|
| 6 || 11 || 8 || 6 || 133 || 92 || 225 || 64 || 19 || 0.7 || 0.5 || 12.1 || 8.4 || 20.5 || 5.8 || 1.7|| 2
|- style="background:#eaeaea;"
! scope="row" style="text-align:center" | 2015
|style="text-align:center;"|
| 6 || 21 || 6 || 7 || 270 || 185 || 455 || 137 || 38 || 0.3 || 0.3 || 12.9 || 8.8 || 21.7 || 6.5 || 1.8|| 0
|-
! scope="row" style="text-align:center" | 2016
|style="text-align:center;"|
| 6 || 21 || 11 || 5 || 246 || 187 || 433 || 123 || 73 || 0.5 || 0.2 || 11.7 || 8.9 || 20.6 || 5.9 || 3.5|| 3
|- style="background:#eaeaea;"
! scope="row" style="text-align:center" | 2017
|style="text-align:center;"|
| 6 || 18 || 10 || 7 || 246 || 186 || 432 || 109 || 60 || 0.6 || 0.4 || 13.7 || 10.3 || 24.0 || 6.1 || 3.3|| 5
|-
! scope="row" style="text-align:center" | 2018
|style="text-align:center;"|
| 6 || 24 || 6 || 9 || 395 || 247 || 642 || 161 || 77 || 0.3 || 0.4 || 16.5 || 10.3 || 26.8 || 6.7 || 3.2|| 16
|- style="background:#eaeaea;"
! scope="row" style="text-align:center" | 2019
|style="text-align:center;"|
| 6 || 19 || 11 || 7 || 322 || 191 || 513 || 146 || 53 || 0.6 || 0.4 || 17.0 || 10.1 || 27.0 || 7.7 || 2.8|| 12
|-
| scope=row | 2020 ||  || 6
| 17 || 1 || 2 || 224 || 166 || 390 || 111 || 34 || 0.1 || 0.1 || 13.2 || 9.8 || 22.9 || 6.5 || 2.0 || 4
|- class="sortbottom"
! colspan=3| Career
! 150
! 61
! 47
! 2010
! 1412
! 3422
! 954
! 396
! 0.4
! 0.3
! 13.4
! 9.4
! 22.8
! 6.3
! 2.6
! 43
|}

Notes

References

External links

Living people
1994 births
Australian rules footballers from Victoria (Australia)
Greater Western Sydney Giants players
Dandenong Stingrays players
Kevin Sheedy Medal winners
All-Australians (AFL)